South Goa Lok Sabha constituency (Mormugao prior to 2008) is one of two Lok Sabha (parliamentary) constituencies in Goa in western India along with North Goa.

Assembly segments
Presently, South Goa Lok Sabha constituency comprises 20 Vidhan Sabha (legislative assembly) segments. These are:

Members of Parliament

^ by poll

Election results

2024

2019

2014

2009

See also
 South Goa district
 List of Constituencies of the Lok Sabha

Notes

Lok Sabha constituencies in Goa
Politics of Goa
South Goa district
Vasco da Gama, Goa